The 2022 SBS Entertainment Awards presented by Seoul Broadcasting System (SBS), took place on December 17, 2022, at SBS Prism Tower in Sangam-dong, Mapo-gu, Seoul. This year 4 special stages were prepared, that included a surprise celebration stage for the performers who made SBS entertainment shine, special congratulatory stages for NewJeans, who performed a collaboration stage with FC Balladream, the 'Fantastic Family - DNA Singer', consisting of the Seo Mun-tak sisters, and the Yeong-ji family, and also a special collaboration stage between Seo Moon-tak and Youngji.

Yoo Jae-suk won the Grand Prize for the 7th time whereas Tak Jae-hoon, who was also nominated for the grand prize, won the producer award.

Nominations and winners

Presenters

Performances

Notes

See also
 2022 KBS Entertainment Awards
 2022 MBC Entertainment Awards

References

External links 
  

Seoul Broadcasting System original programming
SBS Entertainment Awards
2022 television awards
2022 in South Korea
2022 in South Korean television